The High Fructose Adventures of Annoying Orange  is an American live-action/animated television series created by Tom Sheppard and Dane Boedigheimer for Cartoon Network. Based on the characters from the web series Annoying Orange, created by Boedigheimer and Spencer Grove, it was produced by Annoying Orange, Inc., The Collective, and 14th Hour Productions. A preview aired on May 28, 2012, and the official premiere was on June 11, 2012. The show ended on March 17, 2014, with two seasons and sixty episodes, with a total of thirty episodes per season.

Despite negative reviews, the series was an audience success reaching more than 3.56 million viewers in its final episode. Though one of the highest-rated shows on Cartoon Network in the 2010s, the series was canceled. The series also featured many well-known guest stars such as Mark Hamill, Slash, Kendall Jenner, Jim Parsons, Carly Rae Jepsen, Carlos Alazraqui, Jim Belushi, Matt Bomer, "Weird Al" Yankovic, Rainn Wilson, among others.

Plot
The show follows the lives of Orange and his friends: the sarcastic Pear, the sassy Passion Fruit, the tiny Midget Apple, the eccentric Marshmallow, the unlucky Apple, the elderly Grandpa Lemon, and the sometimes antagonistic Grapefruit. The show diverges from the YouTube series in that the Fruit Gang lives on a fruit stand in a supermarket called "Dane Boe's" (a reference to the creator Dane Boedigheimer) rather than in Dane Boedigheimer's kitchen.

A reoccurring character from the Annoying Orange YouTube series called Nerville (played by internet personality Toby Turner) now runs the supermarket (mainly as the janitor), and is the only human who can talk to the fruit.

Episodes

Characters

Main
 Orange (voiced by Dane Boedigheimer) – The main protagonist of the series. He is annoying, obnoxious, and partial to terrible puns. But deep down, Orange always means well, even though his boredom often drags his friends into ridiculous adventures. The series shows another side of Orange that differs from his YouTube persona and casts him as a wacky hero.
 Pear (voiced by Dane Boedigheimer) – Pear is Orange's best friend, and he often stands as the sole voice of reason in the fruit stand.
 Passion Fruit (voiced by Justine Ezarik) – Often referred to as "Passion", she is adorable, pragmatic, and smart. She has a crush on Orange, which is no secret, except to Orange, who sometimes remains completely oblivious.
 Midget Apple (voiced by Dane Boedigheimer) – A small apple with a scrappy demeanor. He prefers to be called "Little Apple", and a running gag is that he will correct anyone who calls him "Midget Apple".
 Marshmallow (voiced by Dane Boedigheimer) – Marshmallow is a cute, eternally upbeat, and cheerful marshmallow. 
 Grapefruit (voiced by Bob Jennings) – Grapefruit is a hulking man-boy who thinks of himself as "large and in charge". He believes he is in a rivalry with Orange for Passion Fruit's affection, but she has no interest in him.
 Apple (voiced by Harland Williams) – Apple is an insecure and pessimistic criticizer who rarely joins Orange's adventures for fear he will get bruised, though he usually ends up even worse off just by staying behind. There is a running gag where Apple gets killed in every episode, similar to Kenny McCormick from South Park.
 Grandpa Lemon (voiced by Kevin Brueck) – Grandpa Lemon is the befuddled, elder statesman of the fruit stand. He thinks he is everybody's grandpa and has a habit of falling asleep mid-sentence.
 Nerville (played by Toby Turner) – Nerville is an employee at Daneboes Fruit Store, where he lives, and is the only human who can talk to the fruits (as other humans dismiss it as insanity). He is a close friend to the fruits.

Supporting
 Coconut (voiced by Tom Kenny) – Good-natured, but dim and hard-headed, Coconut is an occasional member of the Fruit Gang where he serves as the muscle.
 Peach (voiced by Felicia Day) – Another member of the Fruit Gang, she is a peach who normally makes cameos. 
 Broccoli Alien Overlord (voiced by Rob Paulsen) – An evil alien broccoli, who speaks with an English accent, and serves as the main antagonist of the series. He is bent on enslaving Earth and becoming superior to fruit, though later his goals seem to be focused solely on destroying the Fruit Cart.
 Guava (voiced by Tom Kenny) is a member of the Fruit Gang who got women's legs after dreaming about them.
 Ginger (voiced by Felicia Day) – An organic ginger root who has a crush on Pear.
 Elderly Banana (voiced by Tom Sheppard) - A very old and ripe banana that talks about scary stuff when he is with the Fruit Gang.
 Big Rock Candy Monster (voiced by John DiMaggio) – A monster made entirely of rock candy and a native of the planet Marshmalia. Upset because marshmallows took their place in desserts, he swore revenge against them. After his initial appearance, he becomes a reoccurring character. He has also appeared in the Annoying Orange YouTube channel in a Gangnam Style parody video.

Special guest stars

 Curtis Armstrong as Pea
 Dee Bradley Baker as Bananadon
 Ben Giroux as the Ugly Princess of the Realm
 Jim Belushi as Jim Salad
 Jeff Bennett as Potato
 Dane Boedigheimer as Camping Dude, Kingpin, Security Officers, Neighborhood Watch Posse, Tennis Ball, Fruit, Apple, Orange on tree, Pauly Dingdang, Lettuce, Palace Gourd
 Matt Bomer as Joseph Celery
 Kevin Brueck as Kingpin, Milk Bottle, Baby Kumquat, Neighborhood Watch Posse, Apple Trebek, the Bries Member #1
 Blake Clark as Sheriff Cantaloupe
 Cuddles as Herself
 Tim Curry as Arugula, Endive, Professor Plum, Reporter
 Michael Clarke Duncan as King Marshmallow: Marshmallow's Father, Chunkee Cheeses
 Alice Cooper as Himself
 David Cross as Shakesparagus Speare
 Jim Cummings as Rotten Tomato, Pineapple, Tennis Ball, Tomato, the Bries Member #2 and the Market Grandmaster
 Shane Dawson as Popcorn, the Ghost of Christmas Past, Kevin Bacon
 Felicia Day as Marshmallow, Daneboe's Customer, Zucchini Actress, Starrie
 Jack DeSena as Green Bean Sam
 John DiMaggio as Leader of the Squashies, Sweet Cookie, Tumble Weed, Mango
 Carl Edwards as Chariot Racer (ep. 221 – "Orange Julius Caesar") (Season 2)
 Stephen Furst
 Gilbert Gottfried as Alfalfa
 Scott Grimes as Dr. Cauliflower
 Dave Grohl as Mayor Chipwich
 Jennifer Hale as Pinky, Rutabaga 
 Tony Hale as Caesar
 Christine Marie Cabanos as Strawberry
 Armie Hammer as Cranberry, the Ghost of Christmas Future
 Jess Harnell as the Cyber-Midget 4000
 Tony Hawk as Ripe Rind
 Gabriel Iglesias as Mr. Cash, Smash
 Eddie Izzard as Sean
 Kendall Jenner as Strawberry
 Bob Jennings as Zucchini, Kingpin, Milk Bottle, Neighborhood Watch Posse, Stomach Shark, Tumblewood, Kiwi
 Carly Rae Jepsen as Swiss Cheese Singer
 Maryke Hendrikse as Little girl, Announcer, Plane Flight Attendant, Pilot, Cabbage
 Ashley Johnson as Jenny Applesauce
 Michael Johnson as Young Orange
 Sally Kellerman as Romaine Empress / Marshmallow Queen
 Tom Kenny as Malacorn, Banger, Announcer, Kiwi Flight Attendant, Mandarin (Cutesie), Watermelon, Teddy Juicer, Onions, Herb, Moriartichoke, The Beet-Uls, Grapes, Docturnip Who
 Phil LaMarr as Corny, Samuel Jackfruit, Auto Pilot, Fusilli the Kid, Brianca, Cupcake, The Breeze Member #3, Apple (Fruiturama), Bobby, Eggplant
 Matt Lanter as Pepper Jack Actor
 Philip Lawrence as Mix Master BLT
 Kellan Lutz
 Jane Lynch as Cob
 Mark Hamill as Dr. Swiss DiVil
 Slash as Squish the Guitarist
 Tress MacNeille as Cyber-Peach, Strawberry, Pea Girl #3
 Aaron Massey as Hamster, Onion Ring
 Jack McBrayer as Fruitsy the Snowfruit
 Malcolm McDowell as the Dark Knight
 Maria Menounos as Herself
 Bret Michaels as Himself, Knife
 Kylie Minogue
 Brandon Molale as Thug
 Juan Pablo Montoya as Chariot Racer (ep. 221 – "Orange Julius Caesar") (Season 2)
 Olivia Munn as Fudgie
 Nanook as Himself
 Seth Green as Rambutan Steve, Lychee Ross, Cucumber, Pepper
 Rob Paulsen as Marshmallow Warriors, Dr. Sigmund Fruit, Dr. Fruitenstein, Thomas Jefferson, Rock, Apricot, President Dane, Junior, Sour Grapes, Green Apple
 James Remar as Jack Berry
 Leah Remini as Polly Prune
 Kevin Michael Richardson as Quan Chi
 Jason Marsden as Cake
 Kristen Schaal as Blueberry, Eggplant
 Jeremy Shada as Dustin Berry, Apple Jr.
 Josh Shada as Baby Carrot
 Zack Shada as Midget Pear/Little Pear
 Alan Shearman as Heirloom Tomato, Blue
 Dina Sherman as Cucumber
 Tom Sheppard as Camping Dude, Unicorn DJ Princess Buttercup, Eggplant, Turnip, Onion, Li'l Squishy, Neighborhood Watch Posse, Singer
 Kath Soucie as Eggfruit, Starrie, Pea Girl #2, Baby Sparkle
 Nick Swardson as Jason Jr., Zorzam
 Cree Summer as Apple Singer, Mr. Cash, Pomegranate, The Pom Pom Girls
 Alexandra Breckenridge as Apple Singer
 George Takei as Pepper McPotts
 Jeffrey Tambor as Mr. Orange, Blueberry
 Jim Tasker as FNN Announcer, Fruit Fruitale
 Fred Tatasciore as Cyber-Grapefruit
 Danny Trejo as Cupcake Leader, El Dente
 Toby Turner as Smithins
 Olivia Wilde as Rainbow Fairy
 Billy Dee Williams as Old Carrot, Cucumber Referee
 Harland Williams as Corn, Milk Bottle, Neighborhood Watch Posse, Ninja Tomato Leader, Lime, Eggplant
 Matthew Willig as Thug
 Rainn Wilson as Dr. Po
 "Weird Al" Yankovic as Himself, Bruce Dillas, Pumpkin

Production
Boedigheimer confirmed that he had started producing a TV series based on The Annoying Orange in April 2010. Boedigheimer finished the script for the first 6 episodes of the show in October of that year. When Boedigheimer began filming the pilot episode of the TV show in February 2011, he discussed with Cartoon Network about airing it on the station, which was picked up on November 18 of that year. The pilot episode had been completed in about 6–7 months.

There were originally intended to be 6 episodes of the show, but the Season 1 episode order was eventually increased to 30 segments. Subsequently, the show was green-lit for a 30-episode second season. The second season premiered on May 16, 2013.

The show was produced by Boedigheimer, Conrad Vernon and Tom Sheppard, co-executive-produced by Spencer Grove, Kevin Brueck, Robert Jennings and Aaron Massey, and produced with Gary Binkow, Michael Green and Dan Weinstein.

Most of the visual effects, compositing, off-line, on-line, audio, RED Camera footage, graphics, and animation were done at Kappa Studios in Burbank, California. The episodes were completed in 6 days using the Adobe Creative Suite, with each episode having 47,000 frames over stabilization. 3D software such as Cinema 4D and Lightwave were also used since in the show's second season. Production for Season 2 was completed in October 2013. Despite having a lot of live action, the show is still considered a cartoon.

Cancellation
On December 5, 2014, Boedigheimer publicly confirmed the cancellation of the series on his web series, Daneboe Exposed.

On April 24, 2015, Boedigheimer claimed that one of the main cause of the series cancellation was the shutdown of his studio, due to Collective Digital Studio closing their film and television division, and subsequently Collective was acquired by ex-Kirch media company ProSiebenSat.1 Media.

DVD releases
The series currently has one DVD release containing its 1st season.

Reception
A sneak peek was aired on May 28, 2012, and the series officially premiered on June 11, 2012, as the Television's #1 Telecast of the Day Among Boys 6–11. In its first 2 weeks, the show averaged nearly 2.5 million viewers.

References

External links

Cartoon Network original programming
2010s American comedy television series
2012 American television series debuts
2014 American television series endings
American television series with live action and animation
English-language television shows
Television series based on Internet-based works
Television series about size change
Television shows set in North Dakota
Fruit and vegetable characters
American television spin-offs
The Annoying Orange